The Polish Party was a political party in the German Empire and the Free City of Danzig. Representing the Polish population in Germany, it was the largest of the minority parties.

History
The party had its origins in the national associations that were established during the 1848 revolution, but was formally established when the first Reichstag was elected in 1871. It won 13 seats in the elections, the lowest number of seats it held in the Reichstag until World War I. Its best performance was in the 1907 elections, when it won 20 seats.

Following the war and the loss of Polish-dominated territory to newly established Poland, the party ceased to exist.

Ideology
The party opposed the Germanisation and secularisation policies of the government, seeking to protect the rights of Poles living in Germany. It was usually allied with the Centre Party and other minority parties.

See also
Sejm of the Grand Duchy of Posen

References

Defunct political parties in Germany
Polish minority in Germany
Political parties of minorities in Germany
Political parties established in 1871
1918 disestablishments in Germany